Charles Simpson (born December 1861; date of death unknown) was an English footballer.

Career
Simpson played as a right-half in Port Vale's first recorded line-up on 9 December 1882, in what was a 5–1 defeat at nearby Stoke in a Staffordshire Senior Cup second round replay. He quickly established himself as a first team player and was a member of the sides that lifted the North Staffordshire Charity Challenge Cup in 1883, counting only competitive games he was the club's top scorer in the 1883–84 season. He was one of numerous players who scored in the 12–0 defeat of Ironbridge in the Burslem Challenge Cup final on 21 March 1885, and also a part of the side that shared the North Staffordshire Charity Challenge Cup in 1885. After helping the club reach the FA Cup Fifth Round in 1886, he broke his leg in a 1–1 home draw with Bootle on 20 November 1886. Following his recovery his appearances were limited. He became a coach for the club from September 1888, but was later released, most likely at the end of the 1889–90 season. He had scored a recorded 15 goals in 107 games for the club, the majority of these games being friendlies.

Career statistics
Source:

Honours
Port Vale
North Staffordshire Charity Challenge Cup: 1883
Burslem Challenge Cup: 1885
North Staffordshire Charity Challenge Cup: 1885 (shared)

Notes
A.  That season only had four competitive games and only three of these had the goal scorers recorded. Including friendlies Billy Reynolds easily scored more goals than Simpson.
B.  He only played one league match due to the rarity of league football in his time.

References

1861 births
Year of death missing
Sportspeople from Burslem
English footballers
Association football midfielders
Port Vale F.C. players
Association football coaches